Consuelo Salgar de Montejo (30 September 1928 – 2 October 2002) was a Colombian journalist, advertising executive, media entrepreneur, and politician.

Salgar studied in England and the United States. She joined McCann Erickson and later established Publicidad Técnica, her own advertising agency. She directed Ella, él y alguien más, a television sitcom, worked for Semana, and founded Flash magazine. In 1966, she won a bid for the first private television channel in Colombia, Teletigre (TV-9 Bogotá), which lasted 5 years until the new elected government decided not to renew its license. Salgar founded four newspapers: El Periódico, El Matutino, El Caleño, and El Bogotano.

Writer of the book; "Un siglo en Guerra".

Politics  

As a politician, she founded the Liberal Independent Movement (MIL), a dissident faction of the Colombian Liberal Party which would join the Frente Unido por el Pueblo, coalition with left-wing MOIR and populist ANAPO. Salgar was a senator, a Representative of the House, a deputy for Cundinamarca Assembly, and president of Bogotá City Council.

Salgar was an outspoken opponent of President Julio César Turbay Ayala's Security Statute. During Turbay's government she was arrested and sentenced to one year of imprisonment by a military judge on 7 November 1979, for allegedly having a legal gun of his property. She would be released 3 months later. Salgar brought the case to the United Nations Human Rights Committee.

Personal life
Consuelo was born on 30 September 1928, in Bogotá, Colombia to Jorge Salgar de la Cuadra and Margot Jaramillo Arango. She married fellow advertising executive Leopoldo Montejo Peñaredonda with whom she had five children: Leopoldo, Patricia, Mauricio, Andrés, and Felipe. She died in Miami on 1 October 2002.

References

1928 births
2002 deaths
National University of Colombia alumni
Colombian psychologists
Colombian women psychologists
Colombian journalists
Colombian women journalists
Colombian Liberal Party politicians
Colombian newspaper founders
Members of the Chamber of Representatives of Colombia
Members of the Senate of Colombia
20th-century Colombian women politicians
20th-century Colombian politicians
20th-century psychologists
20th-century journalists
University of California alumni
https://www.nytimes.com/1972/06/03/archives/womens-lib-in-colombia-the-restraint-is-fading.html